John Reginald Owens (6 February 1890 – 1944) was an English footballer born in Wirral who played for Rochdale. In 1921 he became the first ever player to score a hat-trick for Rochdale since they joined the Football League Third Division North.

References

Rochdale A.F.C. players
Tranmere Rovers F.C. players
Cammell Laird 1907 F.C. players
1890 births
1967 deaths
English footballers
Footballers from Liverpool
Association footballers not categorized by position